Quincy-Voisins is a commune in the Seine-et-Marne governmental department in the Île-de-France region of north-central France.

Demographics
The inhabitants of the commune are called Quincéens in French.

Twin towns
The town is twinned with the village of Braunston in Northamptonshire, England.

See also
Communes of the Seine-et-Marne department

References

External links

1999 Land Use, from IAURIF (Institute for Urban Planning and Development of the Paris-Île-de-France région) 

Communes of Seine-et-Marne